SEIU District 1199P is the former name of a health care workers local union of the Service Employees International Union in Pennsylvania. It is now called SEIU Healthcare Pennsylvania. It has a membership of 20,000.

External links
Official site

Service Employees International Union
Trade unions in Pennsylvania